This is a list of towns and villages in Saint Helena, Ascension and Tristan da Cunha, consisting of the island of Saint Helena, Ascension Island and the islands of Tristan da Cunha.

Ascension Island

Wideawake Airfield (RAF Ascension Island) is a fifth area of settlement, but is not a centre of population.

Saint Helena Island

Tristan da Cunha

†although a staffed meteorological station exists on Gough Island.

See also

Geography of Saint Helena
Geography of Tristan da Cunha

References

 
.Towns
Towns
Towns
Saint Helena
Economy of Saint Helena